Hallen is a surname. Notable people with the surname include:

 Bob Hallen (born 1975), American footballer
 Ernest Hallen (1875–1947), American photographer
 Frederick Hallen (1859–1920), Canadian-American vaudeville entertainer
 James Hallen (1829–1901), British veterinarian